Todalbagi  is a village in the northern part of the state of Karnataka, India. It is located in the Jamkhandi taluk of Bagalkot district in Karnataka state.

Demographics

As of the 2001 India census, Todalbagi had a population of 7369 with 3755 males and 3614 females.

References

External links
 http://Bagalkot.nic.in/
 http://todalbagi.freevar.com/

Villages in Bagalkot district